Jaraguari is a municipality located in the Brazilian state of Mato Grosso do Sul. Its population was 7,342 (2021) and its area is 2,913 km².

History 
It was first settled by Brazilians in 1875 when Porfirio Alberto de Freitas, his wife, and his brother in-law settled into Jaraguari Velho (then called Fazenda Estiva). In January of 1909,  José Thomaz Barbosa would draw up the borders of the municipality. Later, de Freitas ordered the construction of a church. It was only completed in 1923. It had been named Senhor Divino Espírito Santo, and was destroyed in 1930. 
After that, Japanese settlers arrived and created a separate community.
In 1953, Jaraguari was made a municipality. The name was derived from Araguari, the old hometown of de Freitas. A J was added because Jaragua means grass in Brazilian Portuguese.

Deforestation
Jaraguari is largely covered by forests, but has suffered 1.5% forest lost in the past 20 years, with much of this picking up pace in the 2010s.

References

Municipalities in Mato Grosso do Sul